L. Leroux de Touffreville was Governor General of Inde française in the Second French Colonial Empire.

Titles

History of Puducherry
French colonial governors and administrators
Governors of French India
Year of death unknown
Year of birth unknown